The women's triple jump at the 2010 European Athletics Championships was held at the Estadi Olímpic Lluís Companys on 29 and 31 July.

Medalists

Records

Schedule

Results

Qualification
Qualification: Qualification Performance 14.20 (Q) or at least 12 best performers advance to the final

Final

References
 Qualification Results
 Final Results
Full results

Triple jump
Triple jump at the European Athletics Championships
2010 in women's athletics